Laitinen is a Finnish surname. Notable people with the surname include:

Haris Laitinen (born 1984), Swedish football player
Ilkka Laitinen (1962–2019), Finnish military officer
Kalevi Laitinen (gymnast) (1918–1997), Finnish gymnast
Kalevi Laitinen (1919–1995), Finnish speed skater
Kari Laitinen (born 1964), Finnish ice hockey player
Leena Laitinen (born 1957), Finnish chess master
Mika Laitinen (born 1973), Finnish ski jumper

Finnish-language surnames